Brian Mathew Brown (born November 13, 1979) is an American politician and businessman.

From Greenville, North Carolina, Brown received his bachelor's degree in history and pre-law from Ohio Northern University in 2002. Brown was a businessman and CEO for Rep Express Limited Liability Corporation. From 2013 until his resignation in November 2015, Brown served in the North Carolina House of Representatives and was a Republican. In November 2015, Brown resigned from the North Carolina General Assembly to work for United States Senator Thom Tillis. Greg Murphy was appointed  to succeed Brown.

Notes

External links

1979 births
Living people
People from Greenville, North Carolina
Ohio Northern University alumni
Businesspeople from North Carolina
Republican Party members of the North Carolina House of Representatives